Daxingzhuang Town is a town located within Pinggu District, Beijing, China. Situtaed at the alluvial plain of Ru River, it shares border with Wangxinzhuang Town to the northeast, Pinggu Town to the southeast, Machangying Town to the southwest, and Yukou Town to the northwest. Its population was determined to be 23,739 in the 2020 census. 

The name Daxingzhuang was from Daxingzhuang Village, the place where the town's government is seated.

History

Administrative divisions 
At the end of 2021, Daxingzhuang Town was subdivided 20 divisions, of those 2 were communities and 18 were villages. They can be seen in the following table:

See also 

 List of township-level divisions of Beijing

References 

Pinggu District
Towns in Beijing